Cytocladus is a radiolarian genus reported in the family Thalassothamnidae. The genus contains bioluminescent species.

Species
The following species are recognized (incomplete list):
 Cytocladus major Schröder, 1907

References

Radiolarian genera
Bioluminescent radiolarians